Ruatara is a genus of small air-breathing land snails, terrestrial pulmonate gastropod mollusks in the family Charopidae.

Species
Species within the genus Ruatara include:
 Ruatara koarana
 Ruatara oparica

References

 Taxonomicon info

 
Charopidae
Taxonomy articles created by Polbot